HH Maharaja Chhatar Singh Deo Bahadur (8 October 1843 - 16 June 1896) was Gurjar ruler of Samthar State  from 3 February 1865 till his death on 16 June 1896. His son Bir Singh Judeo succeeded the throne on his death.

References

1843 births
1896 deaths
Indian royalty
Maharajas of Samthar